Yaroslava Ivanovna Yakushina (born 24 June 1993) is a Russian boxer. She competed in the middleweight event at the 2016 Summer Olympics and was eliminated in the second bout.

References

External links

 

1993 births
Living people
Sportspeople from Kokshetau
Russian women boxers
Olympic boxers of Russia
Boxers at the 2016 Summer Olympics
European Games competitors for Russia
Boxers at the 2015 European Games
Boxers at the 2019 European Games
Middleweight boxers